The 1987 ICF Canoe Slalom World Championships were held in Bourg St.-Maurice, France under the auspices of International Canoe Federation for the second time. It was the 20th edition. Bourg St.-Maurice hosted the event previously in 1969.

Medal summary

Men's

Canoe

Kayak

Women's

Kayak

Medals table

References
Official results
International Canoe Federation

Icf Canoe Slalom World Championships, 1987
ICF Canoe Slalom World Championships
International sports competitions hosted by France
Icf Canoe Slalom World Championships, 1987
Canoeing and kayaking competitions in France